Theodore Yates (born 28 February 1995) is an Australian cyclist, who most recently rode for UCI Continental team . He has won two stages of the Tour of Iran (Azerbaijan) - stage 6 in the 2015 Tour and stage 6 in the 2017 Tour.  He also won stage 6 of the 2017 Tour of Thailand. All three of these victories have been in the final stage of the tour.

Major results
2015
 1st Stage 6 Tour of Iran (Azerbaijan)
2017
 1st Stage 6 Tour of Iran (Azerbaijan)
 1st Stage 6 Tour of Thailand
2019
 1st Stage 5 New Zealand Cycle Classic

References

External links

1995 births
Living people
Australian male cyclists
Cyclists from Western Australia